The Second Woman is a 1950 film noir mystery-suspense film directed by James V. Kern and featuring Robert Young, Betsy Drake, John Sutton and Florence Bates. Sequences of the film were shot on the coastal areas of Monterey, California.

Plot
This psychological thriller tells the story of Jeff Cohalan (Young). He is a successful architect who is tormented because his fiancée, Vivian Sheppard, was killed in a mysterious car accident on the night before their wedding. Blaming himself for her death, Cohalan spends his time alone, lamenting in the state-of-the-art cliff-top home he had designed for his bride-to-be.

Cohalan notices that ever since the accident, he seems to be followed by bad luck.  Without explanation, his horse turns up horribly injured and he must put it down, his dog is poisoned and dies. These events lead Cohalan to wonder if he has been cursed.

He meets a woman named Ellen (Drake), and they are immediately attracted to each other. She soon learns about Jeff's past and begins to suspect that he may be much more in danger than he himself realizes.

It turns out that his partner in architecture, Ben Sheppard, was trying to destroy him.  Sheppard, who was Vivian's father, held Jeff responsible for her death. But the driver of the car had been a married man with whom Vivian was having an affair. Ben himself had a wife run away from him, and has a psychotic break when confronted with the truth behind his daughter's car crash. Thinking Ellen is Vivian, and angry about his wife running off, Ben shoots at Ellen. Jeff gets hit protecting Ellen, but both survive.

Cast
 Robert Young as Jeff Cohalan
 Betsy Drake as Ellen Foster
 John Sutton as Keith Ferris
 Florence Bates as Amelia Foster
 Morris Carnovsky as Dr. Raymond Hartley
 Henry O'Neill as Ben Sheppard
 Jean Rogers as Dodo Ferris
 Raymond Largay as Major Badger
 Shirley Ballard as Vivian Sheppard
 Vici Raaf as Sue - Secretary 
 Jason Robards, Sr. as Stacy Rogers (as Jason Robards)
 Steven Geray as Balthazar Jones
 Jimmie Dodd as Mr. Nelson (as Jimmy Dodd)
 Smoki Whitfield as Elmer - Porter (as Smokey Whitfield)
 Cliff Clark as Police Sergeant

Reception

Critical response
Film critic Craig Butler wrote: "The Second Woman is an intriguing if frustrating little thriller -- frustrating because it verges on being very good but settles for being merely OK. Part of the problem is that Woman combines elements of various styles -- film noir, psychological drama, mystery, thriller, romance -- but doesn't meld them into a satisfying whole ... All in all, The Second Woman is a good attempt that is worth watching, even if it falls short of reaching its goals."

Film critic Dennis Schwartz wrote: "Robert Young gives a subdued performance that is somewhat credible, but not all that endearing. The film's ultimate villain is the real estate industry that is spoiling the natural beauty in its need to make lots of money. But the brooding melodrama, thought of by many as film noir, never seemed vibrant as a thriller."

See also
 List of films in the public domain in the United States

References

External links
 
 
 
 
 
 
 The Second Woman information site and DVD review at DVD Beaver (includes images)

1950 films
1950 drama films
American drama films
American black-and-white films
Film noir
Films directed by James V. Kern
United Artists films
1950s English-language films
1950s American films